King Myung was the 5th king of Mahan confederacy. He reigned from 144 BCE to 113 BCE. His true name was Myung. He was succeeded by Hyo of Samhan (Hyo Wang).

References

See also 
 List of Korean monarchs
 History of Korea

Monarchs of the Mahan confederacy
2nd-century BC Korean people